Jesús Cardenal Fernández (20 February 1930 – 25 June 2018) was a Spanish lawyer who served as Attorney General from 1997 to 2004.

References

1930 births
2018 deaths
20th-century Spanish lawyers
Attorneys general of Spain
Prosecutors general of Spain
People from the Province of Valladolid
21st-century Spanish lawyers